Rune Bolseth (born 4 July 1980) is a retired Norwegian footballer who played as a midfielder.

Career
Bolseth was born in Gloppen in Sogn og Fjordane and he started his career with Sogndal in 1999. He made his debut against Hødd in a 1–2 loss on 1 August 1999.

Bolseth joined Hønefoss in 2010 after ten years in Sogndal. He made his debut for Hønefoss in a 1–2 loss against Tromsø.

Career statistics

References 

1980 births
Living people
People from Gloppen
Norwegian footballers
Sogndal Fotball players
Hønefoss BK players
Eliteserien players
Norwegian First Division players
Association football midfielders
Sportspeople from Vestland